Heliodorus was a chancellor of Seleucus IV Philopator (reigned c. 187 BCE – 175 BCE).  During his tenure, he is recorded as being involved with an attempt to tax the Temple in Jerusalem in Jewish histories of the period.  Around 175 BCE, Seleucus IV died; some historical sources say that Heliodorus assassinated Seleucus.  Regardless of if he was responsible or not, he declared himself regent after the death and seized the power of the government for his own, hence the suspicions he was at fault.  Helidorus's regency was short-lived.  The brother of the late king, Antiochus IV Epiphanes, was aided by the Pergamese monarch, Eumenes II, and arrived in Antioch.  The Greek aristocracy favored Antiochus IV, and Heliodorus was overthrown.

Biography
One of the main incidents recorded in Helidorus's life is in the book of 2 Maccabees and possibly the Book of Daniel as well. The Seleucid Empire of the era suffered under the harsh indemnities imposed by the Treaty of Apamea: the Seleucids had to pay the Roman Republic a substantial amount of tribute each year to remain in compliance. This likely resulted in higher taxes and a general search for money by the government which could be used to pay the Romans off. Around 178 BCE, Seleucus sent Heliodorus to Jerusalem to collect money, possibly after hearing rumors of wealth hidden in the Temple in Jerusalem. Regardless of whether angels were responsible or not, it does seem that Heliodorus's tax-collecting mission failed, a fact which was celebrated by later Jews.

In 176 or 175 BCE, Heliodorus is reported as arranging the murder of the king in sources such as Appian.  It is unknown if that is true, but regardless, he proclaimed himself regent after the king's death, ruling on behalf of a son of Seleucus IV named Antiochus who was too young to rule.  (The eldest son, Demetrius, was a hostage in Rome at the time and thus not a political threat.)  He served as regent for only months, however.  Antiochus IV Epiphanes, the brother of the late king, had been in exile in Athens; with the help of the monarch of the Kingdom of Pergamon, Eumenes II, he returned to Syria where he was quickly able to convince the Greek aristocracy to support his claim over Heliodorus's.  Heliodorus then vanishes from history; presumably he lost his position in government and was either executed or driven into exile.

Heliodorus stele 

In the 2000s decade, an ancient stele was discovered that referenced Heliodorus and his exact governmental role in a Greek inscription.  It is a proclamation by Seleucus dated to 178 BCE.  In the script on this stele, Seleucus informs Heliodorus that he appoints a man named Olympiodoros in charge of the temples of Coele-Syria and Phoenicia.

The stele is currently displayed in the Israel Museum in Jerusalem.  While this part of the stele comes from the trade of antiquities, an additional fragment from the same stele was found in 2005 in an underground basement of a Hellenistic house in Maresha and it provides the missing portion of the inscription. The perfectly matched pieces have been reunited for display.

The stele was acquired by Michael Steinhardt in 2007, and then loaned to the Israel Museum.  In December 2021, the "Heliodorus Stele" was among the 180  looted artifacts Steinhardt agreed to surrender to the  Manhattan District Attorney's office. As of January 7, 2022, the "Heliodorus Stele" was still on display in the Israel Museum.

Heliodorus in fine art 
During the Reformation and Counter-Reformation, the episode of Heliodorus being repulsed by angels from the Temple was taken in Roman Catholic apologetics as a symbol of the inviolability of Church property. For some time, it became a popular subject in works of artists, notably Raphael's 1512 work The Expulsion of Heliodorus from the Temple.  Artists who depicted the incident include:

 Raphael (1512), Vatican, Palazzi Vaticani 
 Wouter Crabeth (1566), Gouda (Holland), Sint Janskerk
 Bertholet Flémal (1662), Brussels (Belgium), Royal Museums of Fine Arts of Belgium
 Giuseppe Tortelli (1724), Brescia (Italy), Musei civici di Arte e Storia
 Francesco Solimena (1725), Naples (Italy), Gesù Nuovo
 Giambattista Tiepolo (1727), Verona (Italy), Museo di Castelvecchio 
 Serafino Elmo (1734), Muro Leccese (Italy), Annunziata
 Franz Sigrist (1760), Zwiefalten (Germany), Klostenkirche
 Julius Schnorr von Karolsfeld (1860), Die Bibel in Bildern (Germany, Lutheran)
 Eugène Delacroix (1861), Paris (France), Saint Sulpice

References

External links
 

2nd-century BC people
People of the Seleucid Empire
Kings of Syria